Al Ain Mall is a shopping and entertainment center in Al Ain, Emirate of Abu Dhabi, United Arab Emirates.

The Mall was established as Al Ain's first shopping mall in 2001 with around a hundred retail outlets.

See also
 List of shopping malls in Al Ain

References

External links
 Al Ain Mall website

2001 establishments in the United Arab Emirates
Shopping malls established in 2001
Shopping malls in Al Ain